The following is a timeline of the history of the municipality of Nijmegen, Netherlands.

Prior to 20th century

 800 - Fort built (approximate date).
 1030 -  (church) built (approx. date).
 1272 - Saint Stephen's Church, Nijmegen built (approx. date).
 1390 - Public clock installed (approximate date).
 1479 - Printing press in operation.
 1526 - Stratemakerstoren bastion built (approximate date).
 1554 - Town Hall built.
 1589 - 10 August: Assault on Nijmegen.
 1591
 July: Siege of Knodsenburg.
 October: Siege of Nijmegen.
 1612 -  (weigh house) built (approximate date).
 1618 - Collector of Roman antiquities Johannes Smetius moves to Nijmegen.
 1646 -  (tower) built.
 1656 - University of Nijmegen established.
 1678 - European peace treaty signed in Nijmegen.
 1679 - University of Nijmegen closed.
 1788 - Henriette Pressburg, mother of Karl Marx born.
 1794 - French bombardment of the Valkhof palace.
 1824 -  built.
 1839 - Theatre built.
 1848 - De Gelderlander newspaper begins publication.
 1865 - Nijmegen railway station opens.
 1866 - Population: 22,551.
 1879
 Arnhem–Nijmegen railway begins operating.
 Nijmegen railway bridge built.
 1881 - Tilburg–Nijmegen railway begins operating.
 1883
 Nijmegen–Venlo railway begins operating.
  built.
 1884 - Old city wall dismantled.
 1885 -  laid out.

20th century

 1904 - Population: 49,342.
 1911 - Gemeentetram Nijmegen (tram) begins operating.
 1915 - Concertgebouw de Vereeniging (concert hall) opens.
 1916
  (library) established.
 Vierdaagse (walk) begins.
 1919 - Population: 66,833.
 1923
 Catholic University of Nijmegen established.
  built.
 1928 - Jesuit Collegium Berchmanianum established.
 1936 - Waalbrug (bridge) opens.
 1939 - Stadion de Goffert (stadium) opens.
 1944
 22 February: Bombing of Nijmegen.
 September: as part of the Allied Operation Market Garden, the Battle of Nijmegen takes place.
 October: Battle of the Nijmegen salient
 October:  becomes mayor.
 1948 -  factory built.
 1951 -  (church) built.
 1952 -  begins operating.
 1955 -  (cinema) opens.
 1956 - University Hospital established.
 1961 -  opens.
 1970 -  (festival) begins.
 1972
  cultural centre established.
  shopping mall built.
 1974
  (hospital) opens.
  shopping mall and University's  built.
 1979 - University's  opens.
 1980 -  (historic district) designated.
 1981 - Velorama bicycle museum founded.
 1982 -  established.
 1984
 Stichting Nijmegen Blijft in Beeld te Nijmegen (film society) founded.
 De Grote Broek squat occupied.
 1988 -  Theatre opens.
 1991 - Extrapool cultural organization established.
 1994 - de-Affaire music fest begins.
 1995 - Population: 147,561.
 1996 - HAN University of Applied Sciences established.
 1999
 Valkhof Museum established.
  begins.
 2000 - Population: 152,286.

21st century

 2001 -  nightclub opens.
 2004
  cinema opens.
 Radboud University Nijmegen active.
 2005 - 15 November: Journalist Sévèke killed in Nijmegen.
 2007 - FiftyTwoDegrees hi-rise building constructed.
 2010 -  area development begins.
 2012 - Hubert Bruls becomes mayor.
 2013
 "Ik bouw betaalbaar" self-build housing program active (approximate date).
  bridge and  access road open.
 2014 - Nijmegen Goffert railway station opened.
 2015 - Population: 170,774.

See also
 Nijmegen history
 
 
 
 
 Other names of Nijmegen e.g. Nijmwegen, Nimègue, Nimeguen, Nimmegen, Nimwege, Nimwegen, Nymegen, Nymwegen
 Timelines of other municipalities in the Netherlands: Amsterdam, Breda, Delft, Eindhoven, Groningen, Haarlem, The Hague, 's-Hertogenbosch, Leiden, Maastricht, Rotterdam, Utrecht
 History of urban centers in the Low Countries

References

This article incorporates information from the Dutch Wikipedia.

Bibliography

in English
 
 
 
 
 
 
 
 
 

in Dutch
  (bibliography)

External links

 
 
 Digital Public Library of America. Items related to Nijmegen, various dates
 Europeana. Items related to Nijmegen, various dates.

Nijmegen
Years in the Netherlands
History of Nijmegen